The hooded gnateater (Conopophaga roberti) is a species of bird in the family Conopophagidae. It is endemic to northern Brazil.

Taxonomy and systematics

The hooded gnateater is monotypic.

Description

The male's head, neck, and lower breast are black except for a small white tuft behind the eye. Its upper parts are brown, the flanks are gray, and the belly is white. The female has an extensive rufous crown, brown back, and pale gray face, throat, and underside.

Distribution and habitat

The hooded gnateater is found in northeastern Brazil south of the Amazon River in eastern Pará through much of Maranhão and Piauí into western Ceará. It inhabits primary forest and mature secondary forest, both evergreen and seasonally dry. It prefers dense vegetation.

Behavior

Feeding

The hooded gnateater's diet is known to be mostly small arthropods, though it has not been described in detail.

Breeding

Information on the hooded gnateater's breeding habits is limited to descriptions of two nests and a clutch of two eggs. The nests were open cups of coarse plant fibers.

Vocalization

The hooded gnateater's song is "a rapid, slightly musical ascending series of notes" . Its call is "a piercing tchief! or a hard tcheek! .

Status

The IUCN has assessed the hooded gnateater to be of Least Concern, though it was originally assessed as Threatened. Some researchers have suggested that it should be rated Near Threatened.

References

hooded gnateater
Birds of Brazil
Endemic birds of Brazil
hooded gnateater
Taxonomy articles created by Polbot